Andrew J. Myrick (May 28, 1832 – August 18, 1862) was a trader, who with his Dakota wife (Winyangewin/Nancy Myrick), operated stores in southwest Minnesota at two Native American agencies serving the Dakota (referred to as Sioux at the time) near the Minnesota River. 

In the summer of 1862, when the Dakota were starving because of failed crops and delayed annuity payments, Myrick is noted as refusing to sell them food on credit, allegedly saying, "Let them eat grass," although the validity of that alleged quotation has come into dispute.

Background

In the summer of 1862, eastern bands of the Dakota people were living in a small reservation along the southern bank of the Minnesota River.  Their crops had failed and the area had been overhunted, and they were starving. In a meeting at the Upper Sioux Agency on August 4, US Indian Agent Thomas Galbraith directed that only some food be released to the Dakota from the warehouse, as annuity supplies and payments had been delayed by the American Civil War and a government preoccupied with the Northern Virginia Campaign, which threatened the safety of the capital, Washington D.C. 

Andrew Myrick had stores at both Yellow Medicine (also known as the Upper Sioux Agency) and Redwood (Lower Sioux Agency). After Galbraith decided against issuing more of the annuity food, he turned to the store owners and workers and asked them what they were intending to do. Myrick tried to broker a deal with the bands of the Dakota in which the traders were to be paid directly with the federal annuity payments, once those delayed payments arrived, in exchange for the traders extending credit to the  Dakota.

Death

On August 18, 1862 Chief Little Crow led his warriors against U.S. settlements, beginning the Dakota War of 1862. Myrick was killed on the first day at the Attack at the Lower Sioux Agency, where Dakota warriors took revenge at the agency for its refusal to sell them food. When his body was found days later,  "his body was mutilated, his head being severed from the body and the mouth filled with grass."

See also 
 Nathan Myrick, Andrew Myrick's brother

Notes

References
Douglas Linder. "The Dakota Conflict Trials of 1862", (1999), Law School, University of Missouri-Kansas City.
 Gary Clayton Anderson, "Myrick's Insult: A fresh look at myth and reality", Minnesota History, Minnesota Historical Society

1862 deaths
People of Minnesota in the American Civil War
Dakota War of 1862
1832 births
People murdered in Minnesota